Tyla Dickinson (born 3 April 2001) is an English professional footballer who plays for Sutton United,  on loan from Wycombe Wanderers, as a goalkeeper.

Career
Dickinson began his career with Tottenham Hotspur, moving to Queens Park Rangers in 2012. Whilst with QPR he spent loan spells at Stotfold, Beaconsfield Town, Hendon, Waltham Abbey, and Northwood.

He signed a one-year contract with Wycombe Wanderers in August 2021. He moved on loan to Hayes & Yeading United in October 2021.

Dickinson made his league debut for Wycombe on 30 July 2022, at home against Burton Albion. In October 2022 he moved on loan to Hungerford Town.

In January 2023 he signed on loan for Sutton United.

References

2001 births
Living people
English footballers
Tottenham Hotspur F.C. players
Queens Park Rangers F.C. players
Stotfold F.C. players
Beaconsfield Town F.C. players
Hendon F.C. players
Waltham Abbey F.C. players
Northwood F.C. players
Wycombe Wanderers F.C. players
Hayes & Yeading United F.C. players
Hungerford Town F.C. players
English Football League players
Association football goalkeepers
Sutton United F.C. players